Percy Hamilton Seymour, 18th Duke of Somerset (27 September 1910 – 15 November 1984), styled Lord Seymour between 1931 and 1954, of Bradley House in the parish of Maiden Bradley, Wiltshire, was a British peer.

Life
He was the son of Evelyn Seymour, 17th Duke of Somerset by his wife Edith Parker, a daughter of William Parker by his wife Lucinda Steeves.

He was educated at Blundell's School, Tiverton in Devon, and at Clare College, Cambridge. He was subsequently commissioned into the Wiltshire Regiment. He saw service in India, Persia and Burma.

In London on 18 December 1951, he married Gwendoline Collette Jane Thomas (d. 18 February 2005, aged 91), daughter of Major John Cyril Collette Thomas, of Burn Cottage, Bude, Cornwall, by whom he  had three children:
 John Michael Edward Seymour, 19th Duke of Somerset (b. 30 December 1952), married on 20 May 1978 Judith-Rose Hull, daughter of John Folliott Hull, and has issue:
 Sebastian Edward, Lord Seymour (b. 1982)
 Lady Sophia Rose Seymour (b. 1987)
 Lady Henriette Charlotte Seymour (b. 1989)
 Lord Charles Thomas George Seymour (b. 1992).
 Lady Anne Frances Mary Seymour (b. Bath, 11 November 1954), unmarried and without issue.
 Lord Francis Charles Edward Seymour (b. Bath, 10 August 1956), married on 22 May 1982 Paddy Poynder, daughter of Colonel Anthony John Irvine Tony Poynder (d. 28 November 2004), MC, Corps of Royal Engineers, and has issue:
 Poppy Hermione Alexandra Seymour (b. 1988)
 Webb Edward Percy Seymour (b. 1990)
 Leonora Hermione Jane Seymour (b. 1995)
 Hermione Anne Tara Seymour (b. 1997).

References

 Obituary - The Duke of Somerset, The Times, Saturday, 17 November 1984

External links

1910 births
1984 deaths
People educated at Blundell's School
British landowners
Wall family
518
P
Younger sons of dukes